Hussain Mahamed Ahmed, more commonly known as Hussain Bisad (born 1975) is one of the tallest people in the world, at . He held the record for the largest hands of anyone alive until Sultan Kosen took the record. His hands are 10.59 inches or 26.9 cm long. He has size  and weighs . 

Doctors believe that Bisad has a condition called pituitary giantism, that makes growth continue after most people stop developing. Expert in abnormal growth Professor Mike Besser, from Bart’s Hospital, Central London, said he probably has a tumour in the pituitary gland behind his eyes.

Hussain Bisad is originally from Somaliland, and he hails from the Issa Musa sub-division of the Habr Awal Isaaq clan. He fled Somaliland after being shot by Somali government forces during the Isaaq genocide, and has been granted asylum in Britain, where he now lives.

Personal life 
Hussain was born in 1975 in Burao, the capital of the Togdheer region in central Somaliland. In 2015 he married Yasmin Hasan Muhumed in a wedding ceremony in Hargeisa, attended by Somaliland officials like Mohamed Kahin Ahmed, as well as the shortest living man in Somaliland.

Due to health complications he now lives in a care home in Brent.

See also 
Giantism
List of tallest people

References 

Living people
People with gigantism
Somalian refugees
Somalian emigrants to the United Kingdom
1975 births
Issa Musa
People from Burao